is a Japanese yuri manga anthology written and illustrated by numerous creators such as Kodama Naoko, Milk Morinaga, Pikachi Ohi and Kana Yoshimura. It was licensed for an English-language release by Seven Seas Entertainment in 2019.

Overview 
On May 11, 2019, Futabasha released Syrup Adult Yuri Anthology with the theme of love between adult women. The second release was announced in June 2019, and on August 8, Syrup SECRET Forbidden x Yuri Anthology was released with the theme of secret relationships. With the release of the second edition, a Twitter account "Futabasha Yuri Club" was opened to introduce syrup information and Futabasha's Yuri works. As of August 2020, 5 volumes have been released. Some chapters from Syrup were also included in issues of Monthly Action and Web Action.

Media

Manga

Reception 
Anime News Network gave the first volume an overall C+ grade. Silverman notes that taken as whole "it is a bit more miss than hit with a high percentage of stories feeling truncated and at least one premise that badly suffers because of that." However Silverman felt future volumes may show improvement. The OASG rated the first volume similarly with a 3/5, though they did praise the first volumes theme "the variety of stories about adult women in this first volume is just what some yuri fans have been clamoring for." CBR had a more positive reception to the series, likening it to a collection of poems of various themes and praising volumes 1's theme  "Though the harsh realities of love as an adult are painfully clear, the sweetness of its title runs through it all."

References

External links 
Seven Seas Entertainment's Syrup: A Yuri Anthology official website

2019 manga
Futabasha manga
Manga anthologies
Romance anime and manga
Seven Seas Entertainment titles
Yuri (genre) anime and manga